Frogger: Helmet Chaos is a video game of the action-adventure genre released in 2005 by Konami Computer Entertainment Hawaii.  It was released on the Nintendo DS and the PlayStation Portable.  It is the first 3D portable Frogger title.

Story

The story starts when young Frogger is enjoying a sunny day with his friend Lumpy. Frogger then spots a moon fruit in the trees, and he goes off to retrieve it. He comes back and notices that Lumpy wandering off and he is wearing what appears to be a metal object on his head. The journey begins Frogger follows Lumpy all the way to the beach. That's when he realizes the metal object is a mind control helmet. He startles Lumpy which causes him to jump and break the helmet. Frogger then finds out that a crocodile named Dr. Wani and his assistant Ronin are behind the mind control helmets. Now it is up to Frogger to jump, swing and fight as he sets on his quest to defeat Dr. Wani before he takes over the world. The ending of the story depends on how the player chooses to end the levels.

Gameplay
The gameplay is similar to the original 1981 arcade game with some modern elements of platforming games.  The goal of each level is for Frogger to weave through the traffic to reach the other side.  In the Nintendo DS version, the action moves from the top to the bottom, while in the PSP version players must rotate the console 90 degrees.  After a number of levels, Frogger battles a boss.  As a bonus, Helmet Chaos includes the original 1981 Frogger arcade game. The story has multiple endings, depending on how and where the player chooses to end the levels.

Reception
Helmet Chaos has a 71% rating on the review aggregator GameRankings.  IGN hailed the game as a "solid portable title."  Frank Provo of GameSpot said that players looking for a 3D platformer with Frogger mechanics would be pleased with the game.

Game Revolution named Helmet Chaos as #50 on their 50 worst video game names of all-time list.

References

2005 video games
Nintendo DS games
PlayStation Portable games
Action-adventure games
Platform games
Frogger
Video games developed in the United States
Multiplayer and single-player video games
Fiction about mind control